The 2013 H1 Unlimited season is the fifty-eighth running of the H1 Unlimited series for unlimited hydroplanes, sanctioned by the APBA.

Teams and drivers

Season Schedule and Results

National High Points Standings

References 

H1 Unlimited
H1 Unlimited seasons
Hydro
Hydro